This is a list of the National Register of Historic Places listings in Maricopa County, Arizona, excluding those in Phoenix, for which see this separate list.

This is intended to be a complete list of the properties and districts on the National Register of Historic Places in Maricopa County, Arizona, United States, excluding Phoenix.  The locations of National Register properties and districts for which the latitude and longitude coordinates are included below, may be seen in a map.

There are 427 properties and districts listed on the National Register in the county, including 3 that are also National Historic Landmarks. The city of Phoenix is the location of 226 of these properties and districts, including 1 National Historic Landmark; the 201 properties and districts and 2 National Historic Landmarks located elsewhere in the county are listed here.



Current listings

|}

Former listings

|}

See also

 National Register of Historic Places listings in Phoenix, Arizona
 List of National Historic Landmarks in Arizona
 National Register of Historic Places listings in Arizona

References

 

Maricopa